Nelson was the name of a provincial electoral district in the Canadian province of British Columbia.  It first appeared on the hustings in the general election of 1916 in place of the former riding of Nelson City.  Its last appearance was in the 1928 election.  Following redistribution, the Nelson area was combined with the Creston riding to create Nelson-Creston, which first appeared in the 1933 election.

For other current and historical electoral districts in the Kootenay region, please see Kootenay (electoral districts).

Demographics

Political geography

Notable elections

Notable MLAs

Electoral history 
Note:  Winners in each election are in bold.

|Independent Liberal 1
|George Bell 
|align="right"|125 	
|align="right"|10.09%
|align="right"|
|align="right"|unknown

|Liberal
|Archie Mainwaring Johnson 
|align="right"|507 	
|align="right"|40.92%
|align="right"|
|align="right"|unknown
 
|Conservative
|William Oliver Rose
|align="right"|607
|align="right"|48.99%
|align="right"|
|align="right"|unknown
|- bgcolor="white"
!align="right" colspan=3|Total valid votes
!align="right"|1,239  
!align="right"|100.00%
!align="right"|
|- bgcolor="white"
!align="right" colspan=3|Total rejected ballots
!align="right"|
!align="right"|
!align="right"|
|- bgcolor="white"
!align="right" colspan=3|Turnout
!align="right"|%
!align="right"|
!align="right"|
|- bgcolor="white"
!align="right" colspan=7|1 When identified as a "Socialist" in the election results printed in a Vancouver daily, Bloomer wrote a letter to object and called himself an Independent
|}

|Liberal
|James O'Shea
|align="right"|763 	
|align="right"|38.25%
|align="right"|
|align="right"|unknown
 
|Conservative
|William Oliver Rose
|align="right"|1,232
|align="right"|61.75%
|align="right"|
|align="right"|unknown
|- bgcolor="white"
!align="right" colspan=3|Total valid votes
!align="right"|1,995
!align="right"|100.00%
!align="right"|
|- bgcolor="white"
!align="right" colspan=3|Total rejected ballots
!align="right"|
!align="right"|
!align="right"|
|- bgcolor="white"
!align="right" colspan=3|Turnout
!align="right"|%
!align="right"|
!align="right"|
|}

 
|Liberal
|Kenneth Campbell
|align="right"|902
|align="right"|43.14%
|align="right"|
|align="right"|unknown
 
|Conservative
|Charles Forbes McHardy
|align="right"|711 	
|align="right"|34.00%
|align="right"|
|align="right"|unknown

|- bgcolor="white"
!align="right" colspan=3|Total valid votes
!align="right"|2,091 
!align="right"|100.00%
!align="right"|
|- bgcolor="white"
!align="right" colspan=3|Total rejected ballots
!align="right"|
!align="right"|
!align="right"|
|- bgcolor="white"
!align="right" colspan=3|Turnout
!align="right"|%
!align="right"|
!align="right"|
|- bgcolor="white"
!align="right" colspan=7|² Endorsed by Provincial Party.
|}  	  	  	

 
|Conservative
|Lorris E. Borden
|align="right"|1,338
|align="right"|53.07%
|align="right"|
|align="right"|unknown
 
|Liberal
|Duncan Daniel McLean
|align="right"|1,183 	
|align="right"|46.93%
|align="right"|
|align="right"|unknown
|- bgcolor="white"
!align="right" colspan=3|Total valid votes
!align="right"|2,521
!align="right"|100.00%
!align="right"|
|- bgcolor="white"
!align="right" colspan=3|Total rejected ballots
!align="right"|48
!align="right"|
!align="right"|
|- bgcolor="white"
!align="right" colspan=3|Turnout
!align="right"|%
!align="right"|
!align="right"|
|}

The Nelson riding was redistributed after the 1928 election.  In the 1933 election the Nelson-Kootenay Lake area was represented by the new riding of Nelson-Creston.

Sources 

Elections BC Historical Returns

Former provincial electoral districts of British Columbia